Khaleqabad (also Romanized as Khāleqābād; also known as Khāledābād, Khalegh Abad Khanaman, Khaleqābād-e Khenāmān, and Knalīgābād) is a village in Khenaman Rural District, in the Central District of Rafsanjan County, Kerman Province, Iran. At the 2006 census, its population was 34, in 9 families.

References 

Populated places in Rafsanjan County